Tristerix corymbosus is a species of Tristerix found in Chile at elevations of 0 to 2075 meters

References

External links

corymbosus
Flora of the Andes